Rose Red may refer to:

Rose Red (Fables), a character in the comic series Fables
Rose Red (miniseries), a 2002 television miniseries
Rose-Red, a character in the fairy tale "Snow-White and Rose-Red"
Klara Prast, aka Rose Red, a fictional superhero appearing in Marvel comic books

See also
"Rose Red and the White Lily", a ballad
Red rose (disambiguation)